Panieng Karntarat (born 1 April 1921 – 7 July 2010) was a Thai politician and retired air force officer. He held the position of Commander-in-Chief of the Royal Thai Air Force from 1977 until his retirement on 30 September 1981 during the Cold War period.

Education
Panieng graduated from secondary education at Debsirin School, Flying Training School Royal Thai Air Force, Royal Air Force College Cranwell and Air Command and Staff College and Tactical Air Command, USA. In Thailand with Air Command and Staff Command, Royal Thai Army War College, National Defence College of Thailand in 1964.

Career
He received the first royal thai air force service in the year 1941, during the Pacific War in the rank of a pilot officer. After that, he grew up in air force he has held important positions such as the Director of Operations Directorate of Operations, Chief of the Air Staff, and the Commander-in-Chief Royal Thai Air Force on 1 October 1977. In addition, he is also a member of the National Legislative Assembly member, Supreme Military Court Judiciary, Deputy Minister of Defense and Minister of Defense during the government of Prem Tinsulanonda as Prime Minister.

Honour 
  Knight Grand Cordon of the Most Exalted Order of the White Elephant 
  Knight Grand Cordon of the Most Noble Order of the Crown of Thailand 
 1977 -  Knight Grand Commander of the Most Illustrious Order of Chula Chom Klao
  Victory Medal - Indochina 
  Victory Medal - World War II
  Border Service Medal 
 1972 -  Freeman Safeguarding Medal - 1st Class 
  Chakra Mala Medal 
  Ribbon bar of Red Cross Medal of Appreciation, 1st Class

Foreign honour 

 :
 1961 -  Commander of the Royal Victorian Order

 :
  Order of the Defender of the Realm

 :
  Armed Forces Honor Medal, First class

Died
Panieng Karntarat died on 7 July 2010 with a disease at Bhumibol Adulyadej Hospital at the aged 89 years.

References

1921 births
2010 deaths
Panieng Karntarat
Panieng Karntarat
Panieng Karntarat
Panieng Karntarat
Thai expatriates in the United States